The Guiding Purpose Strategy: A Navigational Code for Growth is a book by Markus Kramer and Tofig Huseynzade. It presents in popular science format research on the transformational power of purpose with a focus on brand management, organizational and economic growth.

Summary
The author claims that organizations lack direction and describes purpose as a driving force for organizational alignment and growth. He argues that the impact of speed in relation the development areas such as technology, demographics and many more is underestimated across businesses and that the discipline of classic brand management is entering an area where deeper meaning to what one does is essential for companies, brands and individuals to thrive. The argument is put forward that economic growth and positive contributions towards society are not mutually exclusive. He states that the essence of an organizations raison d’être needs to be rooted within cultural context, expressed through value systems and a conscious approach to brand management. The book describes and illustrates a navigational framework called "GPS" (Guiding Purpose Strategy) to help organizations build strong cultures and differentiated market positions.

References

2017 non-fiction books
Business books